Stylida Football Club is a Greek football club, based in Stylida, Phthiotis, Greece.

Honours

Domestic Titles and honours

 Phthiotis FCA champion: 6
 1970–71, 1985–86, 2000–01, 2002–03, 2012–13, 2017-18
 Phthiotis FCA Cup Winners: 3
 1979–80, 1987–88, 2001-02

References

Football clubs in Central Greece
Sport in Phthiotis
Association football clubs established in 1964
1964 establishments in Greece
Gamma Ethniki clubs